The 26th Filmfare Awards South ceremony honoring the winners of the best of South Indian cinema in 1978 was an event held on 10 June 1979 at Kalaivanar Arangam in Madras.

The president of this year's function was the Major General S. P. Mahadevan, AVSM, General officer commanding, Tamil Nadu, Andhra Pradesh, Karnataka and Kerala. The chief guest of the evening was Tamil Nadu Minister for Information and Hindu Endowments Mr. Thiru R. M. Veerappan.

Awards

Kannada cinema

Malayalam cinema

Tamil cinema

Telugu cinema

Special Awards

Awards presentation

 Lakshmi (Special Award) Received Award from Srividya
 G. N. Lakshmipathy (Best Film Kannada) Received Award from Manjula Vijayakumar
 G. N. Lakshmipathy Received Girish Karnad Award (Best Director Kannada) from Vidhubala
 Shoba (Best Actress Kannada) Received Award from Prem Nazir
 Rajkumar (Best Actor Kannada)Received Award from Major General S. P. Mahadevan
 Hari Pothan (Best Film Malayalam) Received Award from Bindiya
 I. V. Sasi (Best Director Malayalam) Received Award from Thiru Veerappan
 Jayabharathi (Best Actress Malayalam) Received Award from K. R. Vijaya
 Kamal Haasan (Best Actor Malayalam) Received Award from Rekha
 Jayakrishna (Best Film Telugu) Received Award from Krishnam Raju
 K. Balachandar (Best Director Telugu) Received Award from Nutan
 Talluri Rameshwari (Best Actress Telugu) Received Award from Sheela
 Chandra Mohan (Best Actor Telugu) Received Award from Sharada
 V. Mohan (Best Film Tamil) Received Award from Vijayakumar
 Bharathiraja (Best Director Tamil) Received Award from Adoor Bhasi
 Rajkumar Sethupathy brother of Latha Received Latha's Award (Best Actress Tamil) from Asrani
 Kamal Haasan (Best Actor Tamil) Received Award from Rajesh Khanna

References

 Filmfare Magazine September 16–30, 1979.

General

External links
 
 

Filmfare Awards South